"Is This the Love" is a song recorded by German Eurodance band Masterboy, released in October 1994, as the fourth single from their third album, Different Dreams (1994). It became one of band's most successful singles in terms of peak positions on the charts, hitting some success in many European countries, particularly in Austria, where it reached number eight and remained for 12 weeks in the top 30. The song was also successful in their native Germany, where it reached number eleven and was ranked for 13 weeks, and in France where it peaked at number 12 and stayed for 19 weeks in the top 50. On the Eurochart Hot 100, "Is This the Love" reached number 42 in January 1995. Its accompanying music video was A-listed on Germany's VIVA in December 1994.

Track listings

 CD single
 "Is This the Love" (radio edit) — 3:44
 "Is This the Love" (big sound mix) — 6:33

 CD maxi
 "Is This the Love" (radio edit) — 3:43
 "Is This the Love" (union mix) — 5:30
 "Is This the Love" (is this the house techno mix) — 6:20
 "Is This the Love" (big sound mix) — 6:30

 CD maxi - Remixes
 "Is This the Love" (fun club mix) — 6:12
 "Is This the Love" (acid mix) — 5:51
 "Is This the Love" (TNT party zone master mix) — 6:31
 "Is This the Love" (alternative mix) — 5:34

 12" maxi
 "Is This the Love" (is this the house techno mix) — 6:20
 "Is This the Love" (original mix) — 5:32

Credits
 Artwork by Goutte
 Lyrics by Zabler, Krauß and Schleh
 Mastered by J. Quincy Kramer
 Music by Obrecht, Zabler and Schleh
 Mixed by J. Barnes, R. Novarini, T. Engelhard (radio edit & big sound mix), M. Persona (union mix)
 Photography by Julia Maloof
 Recorded and arranged by Jeff Barnes and Rico Novarini (radio edit & big sound mix), Lorenzo Carpella and Max Persona (union mix & alternative mix), Nico D'Acido (is this the house techno mix), Misar and Uwe Wagenknecht (fun club mix), Robotnico (acid mix), TNT Party Zone (TNT party zone master mix), Jeff Barnes, Rico Novarini and Thomas Engelhard (original mix)
 Produced by Masterboy Beat Production

Charts

Weekly charts

Year-end charts

References

1994 singles
1994 songs
English-language German songs
Masterboy songs
Polydor Records singles